The Men's Shot Put event at the 2009 World Championships in Athletics was held at the Olympic Stadium on August 15.  The Olympic champion Tomasz Majewski entered the competition as the world-leading athlete and one of the favourites. Much was expected of the four-man United States team, consisting of defending champion Reese Hoffa, Olympic silver medalist Christian Cantwell, former world champion Adam Nelson, and newcomer Dan Taylor.

Cantwell won the competition, recording a world-leading 22.03 m throw to fend off second-placed Majewski (who managed 21.91 m). Former champions Hoffa and Nelson were beaten to the bronze medal by German Ralf Bartels, who threw a new personal best of 21.37 m to win the host nation's first medal of the tournament.

Medalists

Records

Qualification standards

Schedule

Results

Qualification
Qualification: Qualifying Performance 20.30 (Q) or at least 12 best performers (q) advance to the final.

Key:  NM = No mark, Q = qualification by place in heat, q = qualification by overall place, SB = Seasonal best

Final

Key:  PB = Personal best, SB = Seasonal best, WL = World leading (in a given season)

See also
 2009 Shot Put Year Ranking

References
General
Qualification results. IAAF. Retrieved on 2009-08-15.
Final results. IAAF. Retrieved on 2009-08-15.
Specific

External links

Shot put
Shot put at the World Athletics Championships